Body capacitance is the physical property of the human body that has it act as a capacitor. Like any other electrically-conductive object, a human body can store electric charge if insulated. The actual amount of capacitance varies with the surroundings; it would be low when standing on top of a pole with nothing nearby, but high when leaning against an insulated, but grounded large metal surface, such as a household refrigerator, or a metal wall in a factory.

Properties 
Synthetic fabrics and friction can charge a human body to about 3 kV.  Low potentials may not have any notable effect, but some electronic devices can be damaged by modest voltages of 100 volts. Electronics factories are very careful to prevent people from becoming charged up. A whole branch of the electronics industry deals with preventing static charge build-up and protecting products against electrostatic discharge.

Notably, a combination of footwear with some sole materials, low humidity, and a dry carpet (synthetic fiber in particular) can cause footsteps to charge a person's body capacitance to as much as a few tens of kilovolts with respect to the earth. The human and surroundings then constitute a highly charged capacitor. A close approach to any conductive object connected to earth (ground) can create a shock, even a visible spark.

Body capacitance was a significant nuisance when tuning the earliest radios; touching a tuning knob would couple the body capacitance into the tuning circuit, slightly changing its resonant frequency. However, body capacitance is very useful in the Theremin, a musical instrument in which it causes slight frequency shifts of the instrument's internal oscillators. One of them changes pitch, and the other causes loudness (volume) to change smoothly between silence and full amount.

Capacitance of a human body in normal surroundings is typically in the tens to low hundreds of picofarads, which is small by typical electronic standards. While humans are much larger than typical electronic components, they are also mostly separated by significant distance from other conductive objects. Although the occasional static shock can be startling and even unpleasant, the amount of stored energy is relatively low, and won't harm a healthy person.
The Human Body Model for capacitance, as defined by the Electrostatic Discharge Association (ESDA) is a 100pF capacitor in series with a 1.5kΩ resistor.

Touch sensors

The body capacitance can be used to operate pushbutton switches such as for elevators or faucets. Certain voltage tester probes rely on body capacitance. 
A capacitive touch sensor responds to close approach (but not force of touch) of a part of a human body, usually a fingertip. The capacitance between the device itself and the fingertip is sensed.  Capacitive touch screens don't require applying any force to their surfaces, which makes them easier to use and design in some respects. Furthermore, because of body capacitance, people act as good antennas, and some small televisions use people to enhance reception.

See also 
Triboelectric series
Triboelectric effect
Touch-sensitive lamp

References

External links
Downloadable electrostatic BEM modules in MATLAB for self-capacitance of a human body and relevant human body meshes

Energy storage
Capacitors
Biotechnology